Jack Carter (7 December 1907 – 19 August 1995) was an Australian cricketer. He played one first-class match for New South Wales in 1928/29.

See also
 List of New South Wales representative cricketers

References

External links
 

1907 births
1995 deaths
Australian cricketers
New South Wales cricketers
Cricketers from Sydney